The West Monona Community School District is a rural public school district headquartered in Onawa, Iowa. It operates an elementary school, a middle school, and a high school. The district is mostly in Monona County with a small portion in Harrison County. The district serves Onawa, Blencoe, and Turin.

Previously, the district had two elementary schools, Central Elementary School and Lark Elementary School, and a junior-senior high school.

The school mascot is the Spartans, and the colors are green, white, and black.

History
The district was formed in 1962 with consolidation of the Onawa and Blencoe districts.

On July 1, 2004, East Monona Community School District was dissolved, with a portion going to West Monona, which took about 28% of the district's area.

Schools
The district operates three schools, all located in Onawa:
 West Monona Elementary School
 West Monona Middle School
 West Monona High School

West Monona High School

Athletics
The Spartans compete in the Western Valley Activities Conference in the following sports:
Cross Country
Volleyball
Football
Basketball
Track and Field
Golf
Baseball
Softball

See also
List of school districts in Iowa
List of high schools in Iowa

References

External links
 West Monona Community School District
 

School districts in Iowa
Education in Monona County, Iowa
Education in Harrison County, Iowa
School districts established in 1962
1962 establishments in Iowa